Constitution Park is located in Cumberland, Maryland in the East Side Cumberland district. The park has two playgrounds, tennis and basketball courts, several pavilions, a duck pond and a public swimming pool.  A museum area contains a train caboose, fire truck, a P-80 dual seat trainer and an M56 Scorpion.

The park is also home to Johnnie Long Ballfield, which hosts Dapper Dan Little League Games.  It also includes the Mayor's Monument and a scenic overlook, both directly behind the ballfield.

During the summer, the craft house across from the park pool is used as a day camp.  The park also has an amphitheater, where concerts are held throughout the summer.

Constitution Park is maintained by the Cumberland Parks and Recreation Department.

References

External links
 Official website
 City of Cumberland

Parks in Allegany County, Maryland
Parks in Cumberland, MD-WV-PA
Works Progress Administration in Maryland